Godfrey Ablewhite is a character in Wilkie Collins' 1868 novel The Moonstone. A vocal philanthropist, he is one of the rival suitors of Rachel Verinder, to whom he is briefly engaged before his mercenary motives are revealed.

Religiosity challenged?
Godfrey is explicitly and repeatedly linked to Exeter Hall, site of the most theatrical elements in evangelical preaching: "Exeter Hall again....the performance with the tongue". His unmasking as the villain of the piece has therefore been taken by some as a literal demonstration on the author's part of the hypocrisy inherent in sermonising - the gap between words preached and actual actions. Others, however, point out that Collins has softened his attack on Victorian morality in at least two ways: he changed his mind about making Ablewhite (initially) a member of the clergy; and, by making him an overt hypocrite, philanthropist by day, philanderer by night, he distracted attention from the inherent hypocrisy in the moralistic position.

The result is to leave Godfrey as a rather bland, externalised figure - though arguably one who serves the book's purposes as villain rather better than did the more flamboyant Count Fosco in The Woman in White.

See also

References 

Literary characters introduced in 1868
Fictional English people